KBHS may refer to:
 KBHS, a radio station (1420 AM) licensed to serve Hot Springs, Arkansas, United States
 KLXQ, a radio station (96.7 FM) licensed to serve Hot Springs, Arkansas, United States, which held the call sign from 1988 to 1991

Schools 
 Keira High School, Wollongong, New South Wales, Australia
 Kelston Boys' High School, Auckland, New Zealand
 Kimberley Boys' High School, Kimberley, North Cape, South Africa
 Kubasaki High School, a United States Department of Defense Dependents School located on Okinawa, Japan